An accelerator-driven subcritical reactor (ADSR) is a nuclear reactor design formed by coupling a substantially subcritical nuclear reactor core with a high-energy proton or electron accelerator. It could use thorium as a fuel, which is more abundant than uranium.
 
The neutrons needed for sustaining the fission process would be provided by a particle accelerator producing neutrons by spallation or photo-neutron production.  These neutrons activate the thorium, enabling fission without needing to make the reactor critical. One benefit of such reactors is the relatively short half-lives of their waste products. For proton accelerators, the high-energy proton beam impacts a molten lead target inside the core, chipping or "spalling" neutrons from the lead nuclei. These spallation neutrons convert fertile thorium to protactinium-233 and after 27 days into fissile uranium-233 and drive the fission reaction in the uranium.

Thorium reactors can generate power from the plutonium residue left by uranium reactors. Thorium does not require significant refining, unlike uranium, and has a higher neutron yield per neutron absorbed.

Accelerator developments

The "electron model of many applications" (EMMA) is a new type of particle accelerator that could support an ADSR. The prototype was built at Daresbury Laboratory in Cheshire, UK. Uniquely, EMMA is a new hybrid of a cyclotron and a synchrotron, combining their advantages into a compact, economical form. EMMA is a non-scaling fixed-field alternating-gradient (FFAG accelerator). The prototype accelerates electrons from 10 to 20 MeV, using the existing ALICE accelerator as the injector. In FFAG accelerators the magnetic field in the bending magnets is constant during acceleration, causing the particle beam to move radially outwards as its momentum increases. A non-scaling FFAG allows a quantity known as the "betatron tune" to vary unchecked. In a conventional synchrotron such a variation results in beam loss as the tune hits various resonance conditions. However, in EMMA the beam crosses these resonances so rapidly that the beam survives. The prototype accelerates electrons instead of protons, but proton generators can be built using the same principles.

Safety
Unlike uranium-235, thorium is not fissile – it essentially does not split on its own, exhibiting a half-life of 14.05 billion years (20 times that of U-235). The fission process stops when the proton beam stops, as when power is lost, as the reactor is subcritical. Microscopic quantities of plutonium are produced, and are then burned in the same reactor.

Rubbia design
The Norwegian group Aker Solutions bought  "Energy amplifier for nuclear energy production driven by a particle beam accelerator" held by Nobel Prize-winning physicist Carlo Rubbia and as of 2013 was working on a thorium reactor. The company proposes a network of small 600 megawatt reactors located underground that can supply small grids and do not require an enormous facility for safety and security. Costs for the first reactor are estimated at  £2bn.

Richard Garwin and Georges Charpak describe the energy amplifier in detail in their book "Megawatts and Megatons:  A Turning Point in the Nuclear Age?" (2001) on pages 153 to 163.

Earlier, the general concept of the energy amplifier, namely an accelerator-driven subcritical reactor, was covered in "The Second Nuclear Era" (1985), a book by Alvin M. Weinberg and others.

See also
 Liquid fluoride thorium reactor
 Energy amplifier
 MYRRHA

References

External links
: Bowman, C (1992) "Apparatus for nuclear transmutation and power production using an intense accelerator-generated thermal neutron flux"

Nuclear power reactor types
Thorium